Erin Mary Crocker Evernham (born March 23, 1981) is an American race car driver and broadcaster with the Motor Racing Network's Winged Nation. In the past, she played soccer, tennis, and varsity lacrosse on both her high school and college teams. She eventually move to focus more on building a family after starting a personal relationship with her team owner and superior, Ray Evernham, whom she eventually married.

Early career
Crocker first started racing quarter midgets at the age of 7 in the Custom Quarter Midget Club, based in Thompson, Connecticut, and the Silver City Quarter Midget Club from Meriden, Connecticut and was named the Most Improved Novice during her first year of competition. She then moved on to win several awards and three Northeast Regional Quarter Midgets of America championships from 1993 to 1996 while in middle and high school. In 1997, Crocker began running Mini Sprints at Whip City Speedway in Westfield, MA. She became the youngest driver and the first female to win a race at the track. In 1998 she again competed in a 1200cc Mini sprint at Whip City and also with the Central New York Mini Sprint Association (CNYMS). In 1999, she moved to the Eastern Limited Sprint Series, and was named Rookie of the Year.

Crocker started racing professionally in the World of Outlaws while attending Rensselaer Polytechnic Institute in Troy, New York, where she graduated with a bachelor's degree in industrial and management engineering in 2003. In 2002, Crocker signed with Woodring Racing to drive a 360 winged sprint car. She won five feature races as well as twelve heat events, earning her the National Sprint Car Hall of Fame Outstanding Newcomer Award. The following season, she switched to 410 Dirt Sprints, and became the first woman to qualify for the Knoxville Nationals. She won the 410 division's Rookie of the Year honors at season's end.

NASCAR and ARCA

2004
In 2004, Crocker won an opportunity to drive for Ford Motor Company's driver development program, and tested a Ford sprint for Bob East (racing) and Steve Lewis that season. She also became the first World of Outlaws driver to win a feature race that year in Tulare, California.

2005
The following season, she left Ford to join Evernham Motorsports' driver development program. During the season, she raced in the ARCA RE/MAX Series and collected three top 5s, including a second-place finish, five top 10s, and two poles in six starts. She also made her NASCAR debut that season at Richmond International Raceway driving the No. 6 Dodge for Evernham in the Busch Series. She started 42nd after a wreck in qualifying, and proceeded to finish 39th after another wreck. In her next start at Dover International Speedway, she qualified ninth, but wrecked eleven laps into the race after being tapped by Justin Labonte. Crocker sustained a cracked rib from the incident forcing her to sit out some races she was scheduled to compete in. She ran two more races that season, one for Evernham and the other for FitzBradshaw Racing, her best finish coming at Memphis Motorsports Park, where she finished 29th for FitzBradshaw in the No. 40 Dodge Charger. She also ran a pair of Truck races for Bobby Hamilton Racing, at Phoenix and Homestead-Miami Speedway. Crocker crashed in both races.

2006
In 2006 Crocker drove the No. 98 full-time in the Truck Series. She finished 25th in the Craftsman Truck standings. After struggling during the 2006 season, Evernham decided to close the No. 98 team.

During her tenure as a Truck Series driver, a dispute between then-Evernham Cup driver Jeremy Mayfield and Ray Evernham resulted in a series of lawsuits between Mayfield and Evernham. In Mayfield’s legal filings, he asserted that the No. 19 team’s lack of on-track success was due in large part to Evernham’s attention being focused on his personal relationship with an unnamed female driver. At the time, Crocker was the only female driver employed by Evernham Motorsports. Evernham confirmed in an interview with ESPN that the relationship exists and has hurt Crocker's career.

2007
In 2007, Crocker ran a select number of ARCA Series events. She won the pole for the season-opening ARCA race at Daytona International Speedway in 2007. She however struggled, finishing 20th in the race.

2008
Following the fall 2007 ARCA race at Talladega Superspeedway, it was confirmed that she had left Evernham Motorsports. She ran a limited two-race schedule in the truck series for Morgan-Dollar Motorsports, before she was replaced by Red Bull drivers A. J. Allmendinger and Scott Speed. For the ARCA/REMAX race on September 6, 2008, she joined the broadcast booth for SPEED.

Personal life
Crocker and former boss/team owner Ray Evernham were wed on August 26, 2009 in Las Vegas.

On July 25, 2015, Crocker gave birth to a daughter, Cate Susan Evernham.

Motorsports career results

NASCAR
(key) (Bold – Pole position awarded by qualifying time. Italics – Pole position earned by points standings or practice time. * – Most laps led.)

Busch Series

Craftsman Truck Series

ARCA Re/Max Series
(key) (Bold – Pole position awarded by qualifying time. Italics – Pole position earned by points standings or practice time. * – Most laps led.)

References

External links
 

Living people
1981 births
People from Wilbraham, Massachusetts
Racing drivers from Massachusetts
NASCAR drivers
ARCA Menards Series drivers
World of Outlaws drivers
American female racing drivers
Rensselaer Polytechnic Institute alumni
American lacrosse players
21st-century American women
Evernham Motorsports drivers
USAC Silver Crown Series drivers
Racing drivers' wives and girlfriends